The Ministry of Power  is an Indian government ministry. The current Union Cabinet Minister is Raj Kumar Singh.
The ministry is charged with overseeing electricity production and infrastructure development, including generation, transmission, and delivery, as well as maintenance projects.

The ministry acts as a liaison between the central government and state electricity operations, as well as with the private sector. The ministry also oversees rural electrification projects.

History 
The Ministry of Power became a ministry on July 2, 1992 during the P. V. Narasimha Rao government. Prior to that time it had been a department (the Department of Power) in the Ministry of Power, Coal and Non-Conventional Energy Sources. That ministry was split into the Ministry of Power, Ministry of Coal, and Ministry of Non-Conventional Energy Sources (renamed the Ministry of New and Renewable Energy in 2006).

In 2012, the Ministry of Power inaugurated the Smart Grid project in Puducherry.

List of Power Ministers

List of Ministers of State

Central Public Sector Undertakings  

National Thermal Power Corporation Limited
Power Grid Corporation of India
North Eastern Electric Power Corporation Limited

References

External links
 

 
Power
Government agencies for energy (India)
Rao administration